Manuel Martínez may refer to:

 Manuel Martínez Gutiérrez (born 1974), Spanish track and field athlete
 Manuel Martínez Canales (1928–2014), Spanish footballer
 Manuel Martínez Iñiguez (born 1972), Mexican footballer
 Manuel Martínez Lara (born 1980), Spanish footballer
 Manuel Martínez (fencer) (born 1939), Spanish Olympic fencer
 Manuel Alonso Martínez (1827–1891), Spanish jurist and politician
 Manuel Luis Martinez (born 1966), American novelist and literary critic
 Manuel Martínez (politician), 1919-1922 Secretary of State of New Mexico

See also
 Manny Martinez (disambiguation)